People's Labour Party may refer to:

People's Labour Party (Cuba)
People's Labour Party (Papua New Guinea)
People's Labour Party (Saint Kitts and Nevis)
People's Labor Party, Turkey
People's Labour Party (United Kingdom)

See also 
 Laboring People's Party, South Korea
 People's Party (disambiguation)
 Labour Party (disambiguation)